Alexander Goldberg  (1906-1985) was an Israeli chemical engineer. In 1965–1973, he served as President of the Technion – Israel Institute of Technology.

Biography
Alexander Goldberg was born in Wilno, Russian Empire (now Vilnius, Lithuania), studied in London, and immigrated to Israel in 1948.

Goldberg was a chemical engineer, and was general director of the chemical firm Chemicals and Phosphates, at which he began to work in 1948. He also held the post of managing director of the Negev Phosphates Co., and was a member of the board of the Dead Sea Works.

Goldberg was President of the Technion – Israel Institute of Technology from 1965 to 1973. He was preceded by Yaakov Dori, and followed by Amos Horev.

See also
Education in Israel

References 

Israeli chemical engineers
Academic staff of Technion – Israel Institute of Technology
Technion – Israel Institute of Technology presidents
Engineers from Vilnius
Lithuanian Jews
1906 births
1985 deaths
Soviet emigrants to Israel
Date of birth unknown
Date of death unknown